Ezr or EZR may refer to:
 EZR (gene), encoding Ezrin
 Book of Ezra of the Hebrew Bible
 Elizabethtown Industrial Railroad, a switching and terminal railroad in Pennsylvania
 EZAir, a Dutch airline in the Caribbean Netherlands
 Josef Ezr (1923–2013), Czech basketball player